Thomas Michael Ledwidge (18 June 1911 – 6 October 1986) was an  Australian rules footballer who played with Fitzroy in the Victorian Football League (VFL).

Notes

External links 

1911 births
1986 deaths
Australian rules footballers from New South Wales
Fitzroy Football Club players
Yarrawonga Football Club players